Hans-Karl Mayer (8 March 1911 – 17 October 1940) was a German Luftwaffe fighter ace pilot and recipient of the Knight's Cross of the Iron Cross during World War II.

Career
Mayer served with the Condor Legion in the Spanish Civil War with 1. Staffel of Jagdgruppe 88, claiming eight victories. On his return from Spain Oberleutnant Mayer was posted to 1. Staffel of Jagdgeschwader 53 (JG 53—53rd Fighter Wing), becoming Staffelkapitän (squadron leader) in October 1939. He claimed his first victory of World War II on 5 November 1939 downing a French Potez 63. Mayer claimed eight more victories during the Battle of France, including five aircraft shot down on 14 May 1940, making him an "ace-in-a-day".

During the Battle of Britain he then shot down two Hurricanes over the Isle of Wight on 12 August 1940. On 25 August, Mayer shot down a Hurricane for his 15th victory, possibly that of Flight Lieutenant Alfred Bayne of No. 17 Squadron, who bailed out. The next day Mayer shot down two Spitfires. One of his victim was ace Sergeant Cyril Babbage of No. 602 Squadron, who bailed out. Hauptmann Mayer was awarded the Knight's Cross of the Iron Cross on 3 September.

Mayer was made Gruppenkommandeur (group commander) I. Gruppe of JG 53 on 1 September 1940, he replaced Hauptmann Albert Blumensaat who was transferred. Command of 1. Staffel was passed on to Oberleutnant Hans Ohly. He recorded his 30th victory on 15 September. On 17 October 1940, Mayer took off in Messerschmitt Bf 109 E-7 (Werknummer 4138—factory number) on a test flight and never returned, his body washing up on the English coast 10 days later. He was possibly a victim of Flight Officer Desmond McMullen or Sergeant John Burgess, both from No. 222 Squadron RAF. He is buried at Hawkinge Cemetery, Kent.

Summary of career

Aerial victory claims
According to Obermaier, Mayer was credited with 39 aerial victories, eight in the Spanish Civil War and 31 on the Western Front of World War II. Mathews and Foreman, authors of Luftwaffe Aces — Biographies and Victory Claims, researched the German Federal Archives and found documentation for 28 aerial victory claims. This number includes six claims during the Spanish Civil War and 22 over the Western Allies.

Awards
 Spanish Cross in Gold with Swords (14 April 1939)
 Front Flying Clasp of the Luftwaffe
 Iron Cross (1939) 2nd and 1st Class
 Knight's Cross of the Iron Cross on 3 September 1940 as Hauptmann and Staffelkapitän in the 1./Jagdgeschwader 53

Notes

References

Citations

Bibliography

 
 
 
 
 
 
 
 
 
 
 
 Die Wehrmachtberichte 1939-1945 Band 1, 1. September 1939 bis 31. Dezember 1941 (in German). München: Deutscher Taschenbuch Verlag GmbH & Co. KG. 1985. .

1911 births
1940 deaths
People from Rouffach
People from Alsace-Lorraine
German World War II flying aces
German military personnel of the Spanish Civil War
Recipients of the Knight's Cross of the Iron Cross
Luftwaffe personnel killed in World War II
Spanish Civil War flying aces
Aviators killed by being shot down
Condor Legion personnel